The Collège Charles-Lemoyne is a private high school with campuses in Longueuil and in Sainte-Catherine, near Montreal, Quebec, Canada.

References

External links
 Collège Charles-Lemoyne website

High schools in Longueuil
High schools in Montérégie
Private schools in Quebec
Roussillon Regional County Municipality